Tønsberg Hospital is a general hospital situated in Tønsberg, Vestfold og Telemark, Norway. It is the main facility of Vestfold Hospital Trust, part of the Southern and Eastern Norway Regional Health Authority.

A new parking garage and is under construction and will receive the a new helipad on top. Until this is completed the Westland Sea King helicopters use the city's fire department to land.

References

Hospitals in Norway
Tønsberg
Vestfold County Municipality
Heliports in Norway
Airports in Vestfold og Telemark